Keti Tenenblat (born 27 November 1944 in Izmir, Turkey) is a Turkish-Brazilian mathematician working on Riemannian geometry, the applications of differential geometry to partial differential equations, and Finsler geometry. Together with Chuu-Lian Terng, she generalized Backlund theorem to higher dimensions.

Education 
She was born in 1944, in Turkey, where she attended elementary and junior high school at an Italian school. In 1957, her family emigrated to Brazil. In Rio de Janeiro, she graduated from high school at Bennett College and joined the National Faculty of Philosophy at the University of Brazil (today UFRJ), in the Mathematics Degree.

From 1964 to 1968, she taught mathematics at a secondary school in Rio. She completed her university course in 1967 and began her higher education activities at the Institute of Mathematics of UFRJ in 1968. Between 08/1968 to 07/1969, she attended a master's degree in mathematics at the University of Michigan, USA, while accompanying her husband who was study abroad. Upon returning to Brazil, she returned to teaching at UFRJ and began a doctoral program at IMPA. She defended her doctoral dissertation entitled "An estimate for the length of closed geodesics in Riemannian varieties" in 1972, under the direction of Manfredo P. do Carmo.

Career 
From 1973 she joined the faculty of the University of Brasilia (UnB) where she became a Full Professor in 1989. From 1975 to 1978 she pursued a postdoctoral position at the Department of Mathematics at the University of California, Berkeley. During this period, she developed her research under the influence of S. S. Chern and became interested in studying the interaction between differential geometry and differential equations.

After 1978, her visits abroad were short-lived. She was a visiting professor at Yale University, MSRI Berkeley, Institute of Theoretical Physics, Santa Barbara, IMA Minnesota, University of Montreal, McGill University, CRM Montreal, Nankai Institute and Fudan Univ. China.

She is a recipient of Brazil's National Order of Scientific Merit in Mathematics, Emeritus Professor at the University of Brasília, and was President of the Brazilian Mathematical Society in 1989–1991. She has been a member of the Brazilian Academy of Sciences since 1991.

Personal life 
In 1965, she married Moyses Tenenblat, an engineer graduated from the National School of Engineering. Sons Dany (1970), Nitza (1973), Leo (1975) and grandchildren Gabriel (1995), Yuri (1998), Luisa (2000) and Clara (2005) were born of this marriage.

Selected publications

References

Turkish mathematicians
1944 births
Living people
Differential geometers
Textbook writers
Women textbook writers
Instituto Nacional de Matemática Pura e Aplicada alumni
PDE theorists
Members of the Brazilian Academy of Sciences
Expatriate academics in Brazil
20th-century Brazilian mathematicians
21st-century Brazilian mathematicians
20th-century women mathematicians
21st-century women mathematicians